This is a list of Cheyney University of Pennsylvania faculty.

Notable faculty

References

Cheyney University faculty